Stuart Robertson Garden (born 10 February 1972 in Dundee) is a Scottish football player and coach. He played as a goalkeeper for Dundee United, Brechin City, Forfar Athletic, Notts County and Ross County.

Garden was appointed Montrose manager in May 2012, after Ray Farningham left the club. Garden left Montrose by mutual consent in April 2014, after a defeat by Peterhead meant that the club could no longer qualify for the end of season promotion play-offs.

Garden joined Airdrie in October 2014 to work as a goalkeeping coach. He joined Dundee United in the same role in October 2015, and departed in May 2018. Hibernian appointed Garden to a goalkeeper coaching position in July 2022.

Managerial statistics

Honours

Personal
Scottish Football League Third Division - Manager of the Month, November 2012

References

1972 births
Association football goalkeepers
Brechin City F.C. players
Dundee United F.C. players
Forfar Athletic F.C. players
Living people
Montrose F.C. managers
Notts County F.C. players
Ross County F.C. players
Scottish Football League managers
Scottish Football League players
Scottish football managers
Scottish Professional Football League managers
Scottish footballers
Footballers from Dundee
English Football League players
Dundee North End F.C. players
Dundee United F.C. non-playing staff
Hibernian F.C. non-playing staff
Livingston F.C. non-playing staff